Lee Hu-rak (23 February 1924 – October 31, 2009) was a South Korean politician, diplomat and the Director of the Korea Central Intelligence Agency (KCIA) of South Korea from 1970 to 1973. In 1972, during his time as Director of the KCIA, he traveled to Pyongyang on a secret diplomatic mission and met Kim Il-Sung. These were the first formal diplomatic contacts between North Korea and South Korea and led to the July 4th North–South Korea Joint Statement. He was also elected to the National Assembly in 1979 but was prohibited from political activity in 1980 following corruption charges. Although the restriction was lifted in 1985, he stayed out of any further participation in politics up until his death in 2009.

References

1924 births
2009 deaths
Members of the National Assembly (South Korea)
Directors of the Korean Central Intelligence Agency
South Korean generals
South Korean military attachés
Ambassadors of South Korea to Japan
Chiefs of Staff to the President of South Korea